The Thousand and Twelve Questions is a Mandaean religious text. The 1012 Questions is one of the most detailed texts on Mandaean priestly rituals.

The text contains detailed commentaries on Mandaean religious rituals, such as death masses (masiqta) to help guide souls into the World of Light, and the Mandaean wedding ceremony. It is written as a scroll. A detailed overview of the contents can be found in Drower (1941).

Manuscripts and translations
An English translation of the text was published by E. S. Drower in 1960, which was based on manuscript 36 of the Drower Collection (abbreviated DC 36). DC 6 is an incomplete manuscript of The Thousand and Twelve Questions in the Drower Collection missing books 1-2, but DC 36 is the complete version with all 7 books included.

Contents
Contents of the 7 parts of the 1012 Questions:

Book 1
Part 1: The Questions which Shishlam-Rba and Hibil-Ziwa asked of their father Nbaṭ (a diwan; title as mentioned in section 201, p. 158)
Part 2: The explanation of the body (Tafsir Pagra)
Book 2
Part 3.1: Accidental impurity and its cure
Part 3.2: "The Three"
Part 4: The agreed form of the masiqta of Shitil; of the Ṭabahata and of the Dukrania
Part 5.1: Blow and healing
Part 5.2: The celebration of the marriage of Shishlam-Rba, son of Lihdaia-Rba-Zadiqa
Part 6.1: Burial
Part 6.2: Of postulants and priesthood
Part 7: Concerning the postulant's first baptism – admonitions

See also

Ginza Rabba
Mandaean Book of John

References

External links
Full text at Archive.org
1012 Questions (Mandaic text from the Mandaean Network)
1012 Questions (Mandaic text from the Mandaean Network)

Mandaean texts